The Phil Collins Big Band was a side project of English rock drummer, singer and musician Phil Collins, which performed in 1996 and 1998. 

Although best known for his work in pop as a solo artist and progressive rock with Genesis, one of Collins' earliest influences had been the American big band drummer Buddy Rich. The group presented big band renditions of Collins and Genesis songs, including big hits such as "Sussudio" and "Invisible Touch". They also did performances of jazz standards such as "Stormy Weather" sung by Collins himself, and other numbers such as "Chips & Salsa", "Birdland" and "Pick Up The Pieces". The group was primarily an instrumental act, with Collins remaining behind the drums. The group split up in 1999, when Phil Collins started to work on the music for the then upcoming movie, Tarzan. In 2004 Phil, along with the big band, played at the Montreux Jazz Festival, covering the song "There'll Be Some Changes Made" with Tony Bennett on vocals, accompanied by pianist Ralph Sharon and double bassist Douglas Richeson. That can be found on Phil Collins 4 CD boxset Plays Well with Others, published in 2018.

The group released one album, A Hot Night in Paris, recorded in 1998 and released in 1999. The footage of Montreux Jazz Festival 1996 was featured as a bonus feature on the 2010 DVD Phil Collins Live at Montreux.

Collins' work with the Phil Collins Big Band received acclaim and Modern Drummer readers voted him Big Band drummer of the year in 2000.

Personnel 

Rhythm section
 Phil Collins – drums, band leader, rare vocals (Stormy Weather)
 Brad Cole – keyboards
 Daryl Stuermer – guitars
 Doug Richeson – double bass
 Luis Conte – percussion

Horn section
 Harry Kim – musical director, trumpet, bugle
 Daniel Fornero – trumpet, bugle 
 Tito Carrillo – trumpet
 Alan Hood – trumpet, bugle 
 Ron Modell – trumpet, bugle
 Scott Bliege – trombone 
 Mark Bettcher – trombone 
 Antonio Garcia – bass trombone
 Matt James – alto saxophone, woodwinds
 Kevin Sheehan – baritone saxophone, woodwinds
 Chris Collins – tenor saxophone, woodwinds
 Ian Nevins – tenor saxophone, woodwinds 
 Larry Panella – tenor saxophone, woodwinds

References

Big bands
Phil Collins